Sverkerson may refer to:

Boleslas Sverkerson, son of Sverker the Elder, King of Sweden and his second wife Richeza of Poland
Jon Sverkerson ( 1201–1222), Swedish king elected in 1216
Karl Sverkerson ( 1130–1167), ruler of Gothenland, then King of Sweden from  1161 to 1167
Kol Sverkerson, claimant to the throne of Sweden from 1167 to his death a few years later